Natthikorn Yaprom (born  October 1, 1994) is a Thai professional footballer who plays as a midfielder for Samut Sakhon in the Thai League 2.

Sources
https://gh.women.soccerway.com/players/natthikorn-yaprom/440117/
http://player.7mth.com/530499/index.shtml

1994 births
Living people
Natthikorn Yaprom
Association football midfielders
Natthikorn Yaprom
Natthikorn Yaprom